In algebraic geometry and other areas of mathematics, an ideal sheaf (or sheaf of ideals) is the global analogue of an ideal in a ring. The ideal sheaves on a geometric object are closely connected to its subspaces.

Definition 

Let X be a topological space and A a sheaf of rings on X. (In other words, (X, A) is a ringed space.) An ideal sheaf J in A is a subobject of A in the category of sheaves of A-modules, i.e., a subsheaf of A viewed as a sheaf of abelian groups such that
 Γ(U, A) · Γ(U, J) ⊆ Γ(U, J)
for all open subsets U of X. In other words, J is a sheaf of A-submodules of A.

General properties 

 If f: A → B is a homomorphism between two sheaves of rings on the same space X, the kernel of f is an ideal sheaf in A.
 Conversely, for any ideal sheaf J in a sheaf of rings A, there is a natural structure of a sheaf of rings on the quotient sheaf A/J. Note that the canonical map
 Γ(U, A)/Γ(U, J) → Γ(U, A/J)
 for open subsets U is injective, but not surjective in general. (See sheaf cohomology.)

Algebraic geometry 

In the context of schemes, the importance of ideal sheaves lies mainly in the correspondence between closed subschemes and quasi-coherent ideal sheaves. Consider a scheme X and a quasi-coherent ideal sheaf J in OX. Then, the support Z of OX/J is a closed subspace of X, and (Z, OX/J) is a scheme (both assertions can be checked locally). It is called the closed subscheme of X defined by J. Conversely, let i: Z → X be a closed immersion, i.e., a morphism which is a homeomorphism onto a closed subspace such that the associated map
 i#: OX → i⋆OZ
is surjective on the stalks. Then, the kernel J of i# is a quasi-coherent ideal sheaf, and i induces an isomorphism from Z onto the closed subscheme defined by J.

A particular case of this correspondence is the unique reduced subscheme Xred of X having the same underlying space, which is defined by the nilradical of OX (defined stalk-wise, or on open affine charts).

For a morphism f: X → Y and a closed subscheme Y′ ⊆ Y defined by an ideal sheaf J, the preimage Y′ ×Y X is defined by the ideal sheaf
 f⋆(J)OX = im(f⋆J → OX).

The pull-back of an ideal sheaf J to the subscheme Z defined by J contains important information, it is called the conormal bundle of Z. For example, the sheaf of Kähler differentials may be defined as the pull-back of the ideal sheaf defining the diagonal X → X × X to X. (Assume for simplicity that X is separated so that the diagonal is a closed immersion.)

Analytic geometry 

In the theory of complex-analytic spaces, the Oka-Cartan theorem states that a closed subset A of a complex space is analytic if and only if the ideal sheaf of functions vanishing on A is coherent. This ideal sheaf also gives A the structure of a reduced closed complex subspace.

References 

 Éléments de géométrie algébrique
 H. Grauert, R. Remmert: Coherent Analytic Sheaves. Springer-Verlag, Berlin 1984

Scheme theory
Sheaf theory